Wang Junhui (born 18 May 1995) is a Chinese footballer who currently plays for Dandong Tengyue in the China League Two.

Club career
Wang Junhui started his football career when he joined Guangzhou Evergrande's youth academy in 2013. He was then promoted to club's first team in 2014. He made his debut for the club on 16 February 2014 in a 1–0 loss to Guizhou Renhe in the 2014 Chinese FA Super Cup, coming on as a substitute for Luo Jiacheng in the 85th minute. He later made his second appearance for the club on 5 May 2015 in a 2–0 loss against Western Sydney Wanderers in the 2015 AFC Champions League, coming on for injured Elkeson in the 75th minute. He became a rotation player in the middle of the 2015 season when the club faced an injury crisis, making 13 appearances over the course of the season.

On 16 January 2016, Wang was loaned to fellow top tier side Shijiazhuang Ever Bright for the 2016 season. He made his debut for the club on 11 May 2016 in a 1–0 win over Beijing Renhe in the 2016 Chinese FA Cup. On 15 July 2016, Wang terminated his loan deal with Shijiazhuang and was loaned to China League One side Wuhan Zall for half plus one season. On 24 July 2016, he made his debut for the club in a 2–0 win against Shenzhen FC, coming on for Luo Yi in the 57th minute. However, he was substituted out for injury just six minute later. Playing just six minutes for the club in the 2016 season, Wang's loan deal was ended in advance at the end of the season.

On 9 April 2018, Wang involved an on-pitch brawl with teammate Situ Hualong and was sent off during Guangzhou Evergrande's reserve league match against Shandong Luneng Taishan. He was fined ¥200,000 and suspended for training and playing by the club. On 12 April 2018, he was handed a 10-month suspension from 10 April 2018 to 9 February 2019 by the CFA.

Career statistics
.

Honours

Club
Guangzhou Evergrande
Chinese Super League: 2014, 2015
AFC Champions League: 2015
Chinese FA Super Cup: 2014

References

External links
 

1995 births
Living people
Chinese footballers
Sportspeople from Shenzhen
Guangzhou F.C. players
Cangzhou Mighty Lions F.C. players
Wuhan F.C. players
Liaoning F.C. players
Chinese Super League players
China League One players
Association football midfielders